K.K.K.K.K. is the second studio album by Japanese musician Kahimi Karie. It was released on July 15, 1998 by Crue-L Records and Polydor Records. In the United States, K.K.K.K.K. was issued on October 26, 1999 by Le Grand Magistery, following Kahimi Karie (1998) as Karie's second American album release.

Like most Kahimi Karie albums, the songs are predominantly sung in English, though several are written in French. A song with lyrics by Karie herself is also included ("What Is Blue?"), rare in her early work.

Track listing

Charts

References

External links
 

1998 albums
Kahimi Karie albums
Polydor Records albums
Le Grand Magistery albums